

Final standings
Note: GP = Games played, W = Wins, L = Losses, T = Ties, OTL = Overtime losses, GF = Goals for, GA = Goals against, Pts = Points.

Playoffs
Montreal Axion 1, Brampton Thunder 0
The Montreal Axion won the Championship of the NWHL.

See also
 National Women's Hockey League (1999–2007) (NWHL)

References

National Women's Hockey League (1999–2007) seasons
NWHL